Chloroclystis dentatissima is a moth in the family Geometridae. It is found in South Africa, on the Kei Islands (Indonesia), in Sri Lanka and the Cocos (Keeling) Islands.

References

External links

Moths described in 1898
dentatissima
Moths of Asia
Moths of Africa